Eurasia Insurance Company is a Kazakhstan-based insurance company. , Eurasia Insurance company maintained its position as the largest insurance company in Kazakhstan in terms of assets, insurance reserves, equity and authorized capital, as well as the volume of insurance premiums and paid claims.

As part of its overall business strategy, Eurasia places emphasis on the geographic diversification of risks and developing partnerships with companies around the world to achieve a good spread of premium income and exposure.

, Eurasia underwrote 81.46% of foreign inward reinsurance, 30.70% of MTPL insurance, 52.46% of all property lines of business in Kazakhstan insurance market. The premium income of Eurasia as of 1 January 2023 amounted to US$308.39mln, claim payments totaled to US$117.81mln.

Ratings
On 4 August 2022, rating agency A.M. Best affirmed the Financial Strength Rating of B++ (Good) and the Long-Term Issuer Credit Rating of "bbb+” (Good) of Eurasia Insurance Company JSC (Eurasia) (Kazakhstan). The outlook of these Credit Ratings (ratings) is stable. This credit rating is the highest among insurance and reinsurance companies of CIS countries and Central Asia.

On 8 September 2022, Standard & Poor's Global Ratings affirmed its 'BBB' financial strength, issuer credit ratings and 'kzAAA' national scale ratings on Eurasia Insurance. Eurasia is the first ever institution in the Republic of Kazakhstan whose rating is higher than sovereign rating of the country.

Overview
The company was established in 1995 in Almaty, Republic of Kazakhstan, and is presently licensed to provide all types of covers under compulsory, voluntary insurance classes and reinsurance in accordance with the legislation of the Republic of Kazakhstan.

Eurasia Insurance Company is a permanent organizer of the Annual International Risk Management Conference since 2005. The event is held in Almaty.

Eurasia Life Insurance Company JSC incorporated in 2019 is a subsidiary of Eurasia Insurance Company JSC with 100% share.

Shares and Shareholder (Ownership)
Eurasian Financial Company JSC – 95%. The ultimate beneficiaries are the Ibragimovs family, as well as their partners Patokh Shodiev and Alexander Mashkevich.

Boris Umanov – 5%.

Reinsurance
Eurasia has a license No.2.1.2 dated 9 March 2022 to provide reinsurance support in accordance with the legislation of the Republic of Kazakhstan.

The company is included in the security lists of the leading global Reinsurers and is authorized to conduct business by the regulator of Latin American Countries and India.

Major portion of risks reinsured by Eurasia are located in USA, Europe, UK, Australia, Canada and India, and presently provides its reinsurance support in more than 130 countries worldwide.

Eurasia has the ability to insure reinsure all general classes of business and provides reinsurance cover for property insurance including business interruption and machinery breakdown, oil & gaz, construction/erection all risks, marine, aviation, general liability and personal accident.

As of 1 January 2023, gross premiums written in the reinsurance segment amount to around US$131.64 mln.

In connection with Eurasia's global reinsurance support, the company participated in the settlements of several notable claims and catastrophic events, such as Atlantic Hurricane Season 2017, Kerala Flood 2018, Peru Flood 2019, Puerto Rico Earthquake 2020, Winter storm Uri (Texas Power Crisis) 2021, Hurricane Ida 2021.

International and national memberships
Eurasia is a member of the following organizations:

 The International Underwriting Association (IUA), the most influential non-governmental organization in the global insurance industry (London, UK) - since 2010
 The Federation of Afro-Asian Insurers and Reinsurers (Turkey, Bahrain, Morocco) - since 2011
 The International Union of Marine Insurance (Zürich, Switzerland) - since 2010
 The Financial Institutions' Association of Kazakhstan - since 2010

References

Insurance companies of Kazakhstan
Reinsurance companies
Eurasian Natural Resources Corporation
Financial services companies established in 1995
Kazakhstani brands
Articles containing video clips

ru:Евразия (страховая компания)